Biotics describe living or once living components of a community; for example organisms, such as animals and plants.

Biotic may refer to:
Life, the condition of living organisms
Biology, the study of life
Biotic material, which is derived from living organisms
Biotic components in ecology
Biotic potential, an organism's reproductive capacity
Biotic community, all the interacting organisms living together in a specific habitat
Biotic energy, a vital force theorized by biochemist Benjamin Moore

Biotic may also refer to:
Biotic Baking Brigade, an unofficial group of pie-throwing activists
Abiotic Non living

See also
Antibiotics are agents that either kill bacteria or inhibit their growth 
Prebiotics are non-digestible food ingredients that stimulate the growth or activity of bacteria in the digestive system
Probiotics consist of a live culture of bacteria that inhibit or interfere with colonization by microbial pathogens
Synbiotics refer to nutritional supplements combining probiotics and prebiotics